Marry Me is the debut studio album by American musician St. Vincent. It was released on July 10, 2007, in the United States and on September 3, 2007 in the United Kingdom, through Beggars Banquet Records. The album is named after a running gag from the television show Arrested Development. As of 2009, the album has sold an estimated 30,000 copies.

Background
St. Vincent started working on Marry Me before she joined The Polyphonic Spree, and finished it while touring with them. Sufjan Stevens heard it and asked St. Vincent to be in his band and open for him; after a show in London opening for Stevens, Beggars Banquet Records offered St. Vincent a record contract and published the record.

She recorded most of the album's track in her bedroom in Texas. "Half the record" is composed of material that had not been played live prior to the album's recording sessions.

Critical reception 
At Metacritic, which assigns a normalized rating out of 100 to reviews from mainstream publications, the album received a rating of 78, based on 20 reviews, indicating "generally favorable reviews". Critics often praised the ambitious orchestral production of the album, while others found it overstuffed.

Giving the album a rating of 8.0 out of 10, Pitchfork compared the album to the works of art rock legends David Bowie and Kate Bush and complimented its unique brand of sonic experimentation, nothing that the album "takes the more challenging route of twisting already twisted structures and unusual instrumentation to make them sound perfectly natural and, most importantly, easy to listen to as she overdubs her thrillingly sui generis vision into vibrant life". Marisa Brown of AllMusic, praising the album's inclusion of disparate elements, called it "one of the better indie pop albums that's come around for a long time" Comparing Annie Clark's "knack for grandiose orchestrations" to that of former bandmate Sufjan Stevens, Vladimir Wormwood of PopMatters notes that she "tempers these more restlessly than Sufjan. Her lyricism is more opaque and sinister and also belies a twisted sense of humor."

In a retrospective assessment of the record for its 10th anniversary, Margaret Farrell of Stereogum commended its ability to question love and marriage as a social institution. She concluded that "Marry Me made it obvious that [Clark] would have a prosperous career exposing listeners to new points of view and cunning soundscapes". Similarly, Joe Marvilli of Spectrum Culture considers that Marry Me foreshadows the acclaim of Clark's subsequent releases, asserting that "her debut may not have the same impact or cohesiveness of latter albums, but it’s a wonderful example of an artist just starting out and carrying themselves with a confidence that will take them far." The album ranked 25 in Consequence of Sound's retrospective "Top 50 albums of 2007", with Lior Phillips describing the album as "playful" and noting that "[Clark's] gift for twisting and subverting, both musically and lyrically, was apparent even on this first record".

Track listing

Personnel
Musicians

 Annie Clark – voices, guitars, bass, piano, organ, Moog, synthesizers, clavieta, xylophone, vibraphone, dulcimer, drum programming, triangle, percussion
 Daniel Hart – violin
 Rick Nelson – violin, viola, cello, upright bass
 Nathan Blaz – cello
 Heather Macintosh – cello
 Lauren Ross – flute, clarinet, bassoon, trumpet, French horn
 Louis Schadwron – French horn
 Mike Garson – grand piano
 Merrilee Challiss – choir
 Jessica Grant – choir
 Andrea Paschal – choir
 Lester Nuby – vibraphone
 Daniel Farris – choir, synthesizer, percussion
 Mark Pirro – bass 
 Al Carlson – sound design 
 Aynsley Powell – drum programming 
 Brian Teasley – drums, percussion

Production

 Annie Clark – production, engineering, mixing
 Brian Teasley – production, additional engineering
 Daniel Farris – production, engineering, mixing
 Mike Garson – additional engineering
 Jeff Halbert – additional engineering
 Al Carlson – additional engineering
 John Golden – mastering
 Tod Seelie – cover photo
 Mary Manning – cover photo styling
 Hanni El Khatib – design and layout

Charts

References

External links

2007 debut albums
St. Vincent (musician) albums
Beggars Banquet Records albums